Nathan Barnert (September 20, 1838 – December 23, 1927) was an American businessman and politician. He was twice elected as the Mayor of Paterson, New Jersey, first on April 9, 1883. He was the original founder of the Miriam Barnert Hebrew Free School, the Daughters Of Miriam Home For The Aged And Orphans, the Barnert Memorial Hospital and the Barnert Memorial Temple.

Biography
He was born on September 20, 1838, in Posen and emigrated in 1849.

A successful silk manufacturer, Barnert was twice elected Mayor of Paterson, first April 9, 1883, (serving through 1886), and again from 1888 to 1889, and served with distinction. Barnert, a noted philanthropist and humanitarian, was the original founder or benefactor of many Paterson Jewish institutions.

He founded the Daughters Of Miriam Home For The Aged And Orphans in 1921 in a building at 469 River Street in Paterson. In 1921, he purchased the property known as Ashley Homestead on River Street and started this organization, which was named after his late wife Miriam. They moved to 155 Hazel Street, Clifton, New Jersey, in 1927. The orphanage was phased out around 1948. It still operates its Home for the Aged at the Clifton Address.

Barnert founded the now-closed Barnert Hospital in Paterson in 1908. In the same year, he filed suit to have the Barnert Memorial Temple returned to his control.

He died of pneumonia on December 23, 1927.

Legacy

Barnert is one of three men to be honored with copper statues in front of the Carrere & Hastings designed Paterson City Hall. The others are the former Vice President of the United States and Paterson native Garret Augustus Hobart and the former Paterson mayor, Dr. Andrew McBride.

References

1838 births
1927 deaths
American philanthropists
Mayors of Paterson, New Jersey
Polish emigrants to the United States
People from the Province of Posen